Up Front was an American hardcore band from New York City. They were an influential part of the late 1980s New York hardcore and Connecticut straight edge scenes. They played many of their early shows at the now famous Anthrax Club in Norwalk, Connecticut. In 1987 they appeared on the X Marks The Spot compilation 7-inch, one of the first documents of the burgeoning Connecticut straight edge scene.

In 1988, they released their Spirit LP, and a summer tour followed in 1989 with Unit Pride, Insted and Gorilla Biscuits. Up Front remained active through 1992, releasing the Daybreak 7 inch in 1990, touring the US again in the summer of 1991, and completing their first tour of Europe in the winter of 1991–1992.

They initially broke up after recording the Changes 7-inch in 1992, but reformed in the spring of 1994 to record the What Fire Does 7-inch followed with their second tour of Europe that summer.

After a brief hiatus Up Front wrote and recorded the Movement CD in 1997. After a handful of US shows,  a tour of Japan in 1998, and their third summer tour of Europe in 1999 followed.

Other than three "reunion" shows in the summer/fall of 2005, and one "reunion" show with a return to the Daybreak lineup in November 2009 at the A Time We'll Remember Fest, the band has remained dormant since 1999.

Band members 
Steve Keeley – vocals
Jon Field – guitar
Rich Ryder – guitar
Jeff Terranova – bass
Tim Schmoyer – drums

Former members 
Dan Pettit – drums (1987)
Jim Eaton – drums (1988–1989)
Roger Lambert – vocals (1989)
Ari Katz – drums (1989)

Discography 
X Marks the Spot – 7 inch, 1988
Spirit – CD, 1988
Daybreak – 7 inch, 1990
Changes – 7 inch, 1992
What Fire Does – 7 inch, 1994
Doin' It Live on WNYU – 7 inch, 1997
Movement – CD, 1997
Split w/ Building – 7 inch, 1999
Five by Seven – CD, 2004

External links 
Official website
Bandcamp page
Smorgasbord Records
New Age Records
Up Front – BandToBand.com

Straight edge groups
Hardcore punk groups from New York (state)